Filistine Charlotte Bonaparte Gabrielli (born Filistine Charlotte Bonaparte; 22 February 1795 – 13 May 1865) was a French Napoleonic princess and the eldest daughter of Lucien Bonaparte and Christine Boyer. She became princess Gabrielli following her marriage to Mario Gabrielli, prince of Prossedi and Roccasecca, Duke of Pisterzo. In Italy, she was known as Carlotta.

Biography 

Filistine Charlotte Bonaparte was born on 22 February 1795 in Saint-Maximin-la-Sainte-Baume, the daughter of Lucien Bonaparte (1775–1840), the first prince of Canino and Musignano, and his first wife Christine Boyer (1773–1800), herself the daughter of Pierre Boyer. She was the granddaughter of Carlo Buonaparte and his wife Letizia Ramolino, and the niece of the emperor Napoleon I. Her paternal grandmother, Letizia Ramolino (Madame Mère), nicknamed her "Lolotte." When she was six years of age and Christine-Egypta, her younger sister, was two, their mother died at Le Plessis of a pulmonary disease while pregnant with a third sibling. She spent her childhood in France and Spain and from 1804 onwards was educated by nuns in Italy.

When Napoleon's first marriage to Joséphine de Beauharnais was annulled, the possibility that he might marry Charlotte was suggested by her aunt Pauline Bonaparte, as this would have consolidated family power. Under pressure from Napoleon, who wished to arrange her marriage, she was sent to Paris stay with his mother, Madame Mère. Marriage arrangements to the Spanish prince Ferdinando of the Asturias (later Ferdinand VII of Spain) and the grand-duke of Wurzburg (later Ferdinand III of Tuscany) were planned for her by Napoleon but eventually not concluded. Charlotte continuously wrote letters to her father which complained of the hypocritical French court and the ugliness of her female relatives. She even criticized Napoleon himself, and when these letters were intercepted by his secret police, she was sent home. As a consequence of the increasingly abrasive relationship between Lucien and Napoleon, Charlotte, her father, her stepmother Alexandrine de Bleschamp, siblings and household attempted to sail to the United States on 5 August 1810. They were captured by the British and forced to reside, first in the British colony of Malta, and then in England until the fall of Napoleon in May 1814.

During the restoration of her uncle Napoleon for a period known as the Hundred Days, Charlotte was granted the title of French princess (22 March 1815) and the qualification of Imperial Highness. Charlotte was then married on 27 December 1815 to the Roman prince Mario Gabrielli (1773 – 1841). He was the scion of an old Italian Catholic family from Gubbio, the son of the Napoleonic deputy mayor of Rome and nephew of a former Cardinal Secretary of State. She thus became the Princess Gabrielli until his death in 1841.

An outspoken and sincere woman, the Italians referred to Princess Gabrielli as "a true Bonaparte". Even after the fall of Napoleon, she always remained loyal to her uncle's memory, and had a particular affection for her paternal grandmother, Madame Mère, to whom she remained attached until her death at Palazzo Bonaparte-d'Aste, in the Roman Piazza Venezia, in 1836.

She was an avid book collector and the patroness of a literary and intellectual circle that regularly met at her husband's villa on the Janiculum from the years 1820-1840. The "Villa Gabrielli al Gianicolo" was one of the must-see stops of Grand Tour travelers because of the magnificent view on the city, and is currently the Roman headquarters of the Pontifical North American College.

Charlotte survived her husband as the Dowager Princess Gabrielli (1841–1865) and the following year she quietly remarried to her faithful admirer the Cavaliere Settimio Centamori. With the rise of Emperor Napoleon III, Charlotte was again officially included in the Imperial family and recognized as Princess Bonaparte with the qualification of Highness (21 February 1853). Princess Gabrielli died on 6 May 1865, aged seventy, at Palazzo Gabrielli in Rome.

Marriage and children

On 27 December 1815, in Rome, Charlotte Bonaparte married prince Don Mario Gabrielli, prince of Prossedi (6 December 1773 – 17 September 1841), with whom she had eight children:

 Donna Letizia Gabrielli (1817–1827); died young.
 Donna Cristina Gabrielli (1821–1898); married marchese Antonio Stefanoni (1819–1883) and left children.
 Donna Lavinia Gabrielli (1822–1888); married conte Ildefonso Aventi (1802–1857) and left children.
 Don Angelo Gabrielli (1824–1826); died in infancy.
 Donna Camilla Gabrielli (1828–1829); died in infancy.
 Donna Emilia Gabrielli (1830–1911); married conte Giuseppe Parisani (1823–1887) and left children, including the painter Napoleone Parisani.
 Don  (1832–1911); married his cousin princess Augusta Bonaparte (daughter of Charles Lucien Bonaparte and his wife, Zénaïde Bonaparte).
 Donna Francesca Gabrielli (1837–1860); married conte Cesare Parisani (1828–1904) and left children.

After Don Mario Gabrielli's death, she married chevalier Settimio Centamori (1812–1889) in 1842. The marriage was childless.

Portraits
She was represented by the French painter Jean-Baptiste Wicar as a young peasant woman in a life-size portrait, today in the collections of the Museo Napoleonico in Rome. Another life-size portrait by Jean-Pierre Granger is at the Palace of Versailles.

Further reading
 Yacinthe Saint-German Leca. Un aspect meconnu de Lucien Bonaparte. Paris, Imprimerie Jouve, 2006

References 

1795 births
1865 deaths
Charlotte Bonaparte Gabrielli
Charlotte Bonaparte Gabrielli